Saint-Isidore is a municipality in La Nouvelle-Beauce Regional County Municipality in the Chaudière-Appalaches region of Quebec, Canada. Its population was 3,286 as of the Canada 2021 Census. Founded in 1855, it is named after Isidore of Seville.

References

External links

Commission de toponymie du Québec
Ministère des Affaires municipales, des Régions et de l'Occupation du territoire

Designated places in Quebec
Municipalities in Quebec
Incorporated places in Chaudière-Appalaches
Canada geography articles needing translation from French Wikipedia